Pierre Gallien (19 November 1911 – 28 May 2009) was a French professional road bicycle racer, who won one stage in the 1939 Tour de France. He was born in Paris.

Major results

1936
Tour of Romania, overall winner
1937
Tour de France:
8th place overall classification
1939
Tour de France:
Winner stage 13

External links 

Official Tour de France results for Pierre Gallien

French male cyclists
1911 births
2009 deaths
French Tour de France stage winners
Cyclists from Paris